Nicolas Clermont (born 1 January 1942 in Neuilly) was a French film producer. He died on 11 April 2001 in Montreal. He was noted for his involvement in the Canadian film industry.

Filmography
 Reckless and In Love, (1983)
 Eternal Evil, (executive, 1985)
 Toby McTeague, (1986)
 Wild Thing, (1987)
 Bethune: The Making of a Hero, (1990)
 The Sound and the Silence, (executive, 1991)
 A Christmas Story at the Vatican, (1991)
 Armen and Bullik, (1993)
 Bride of Violence 2, (1993)
 The Lifeforce Experiment, (1994)
 A Young Connecticut Yankee in King Arthur's Court, (1995)
 Young Ivanhoe, (1995)
 Rainbow, (1996)
 Hollow Point, (1996)
 Silent Trigger, (1996)
 Natural Enemy, (1996)
 Twists of Terror, (1997)
 The Peacekeeper, (1997)
 Monument Ave., (1998)
 Highlander: The Series, (1993-1998)
 This Is My Father, (1998)
 Free Money, (1998)
 Eye of the Beholder, (1999)
 The Art of War, (2000)
 The Secret Adventures of Jules Verne, (2000)
 The Caveman's Valentine, (2001)

References

French film producers
1942 births
2001 deaths